Gazel is a form of Turkish music that has almost died out. While in other parts of West Asia, gazel is synonymous with ghazal, in Turkey it denotes an improvised form of solo singing that is sometimes accompanied by the ney, ud, or tanbur. It is the vocal equivalent to the Turkish taqsim, an improvised instrumental composition.

The form began to die out in the mid-20th century because of its associations with nightclubs, but it has recently begun a revival process.

References

Turkish music
Turkish words and phrases
Arabic and Central Asian poetics
Forms of Ottoman classical music
Forms of Turkish makam music